Alice Denney (born 1922) is an American curator and arts administrator. Denney has been considered to be an important figure of the Washington, D.C. avant-garde arts and had been the mentor to a number of Washington D.C.'s artists.

Career 
Alice Denney was the first director of the Jefferson Place Gallery. She was intimately involved in the founding of the Washington Gallery of Modern Art (in 1961), and was the founder of the Washington Project for the Arts (in 1975). Denny served as the assistant director of the Washington Gallery of Modern Art.

She helped with the exhibition, The Popular Image (1963), at the Washington Gallery of Modern Art which included Robert Rauschenberg's "Concerto #5", with the Judson Dance Theater. In 1978, she brought the exhibit Punk Art, to the Washington Project of the Arts.

References

Further reading 

 A Tribute to Alice Denney, 50 Years of Life and Work in the Avante-Garde, by Maia Gatcheva, May 9, 2006
 "A Brief History of WPA & WPA\C", Washington Project for the Arts, Laura Coyle

External links  
 Oral history interview with Alice Denney, 1975 December 9-1976 January 27, Archives of American Art, Smithsonian Institution
Oral history interview with Alice Denney, 1976 May 13, Archives of American Art, Smithsonian Institution

Denney, Alice
Living people
American art curators
American women curators
People from Washington, D.C.
21st-century American women